Dan Sheehan (born 17 September 1998) is an Irish rugby union player, currently playing for United Rugby Championship and European Rugby Champions Cup side Leinster. His preferred position is hooker.

Leinster
Sheehan signed his first professional contract for Leinster in June 2020. He made his Leinster debut in October 2020 in Round 3 of the 2020–21 Pro14 against Zebre, scoring two tries. In June 2022 he was named Leinster's 2021–22 Men's Young Player of the Year.

Ireland 
Sheehan made his senior international test debut on 6 November 2021 against Japan at the Aviva Stadium. In the 2022 Six Nations, Sheehan came off the bench in Ireland's win vs Wales and played the majority of the defeat to France after Rónan Kelleher came off Injured in the 26th minute. 
Sheehan earned his first start for Ireland in the February 2022 Six Nations match against Italy. In the final match of the 2022 Six Nations, he scored a try and won the player-of-the-match award in Ireland's 26–5 victory over Scotland, clinching their 12th triple crown. Sheehan was nominated for the 2022 World Rugby Breakthrough Player of the Year. 
On 18 March 2023, Sheehan scored two tries in a player-of-the-match performance against England which clinched the 2023 Six Nations and Ireland's fourth ever Grand slam.

International tries 
As of 3 June 2022

References

External links

1998 births
Living people
Irish rugby union players
Leinster Rugby players
Rugby union hookers
Rugby union players from Dublin (city)
Ireland international rugby union players